The 2008 Welwyn Hatfield Borough Council election took place on 1 May 2008 to elect members of Welwyn Hatfield Borough Council in Hertfordshire, England. The whole council was up for election with boundary changes since the last election in 2007. The Conservative Party stayed in overall control of the council.

Election result
The results saw the Conservatives hold on to control of the council with 40 seats, as compared to 5 for Labour and 3 for the Liberal Democrats. Overall turnout in the election was 36.32%.

A few days after the election the new Conservative councillor for Hatfield Central, Darren Gilbert, was forced to resign after it was alleged that he had made up a claim that he had had cancer, meaning that a by-election had to be held.

Ward results

References

2008
2008 English local elections
2000s in Hertfordshire